South Korea competed at the 2018 Winter Paralympics in Pyeongchang, South Korea, from 9–18 March 2018, as the host nation. In February 2018, the IPC had recommended North Korea to participate, and so North Korea made its Winter Paralympic debut. Teams representing South Korea and North Korea had planned to enter the Opening Ceremony marching under the Korean Unification Flag, however talks between the two teams failed to do so, and they entered separately in the opening ceremony under their own respective flags.

Competitors 
The following is the list of number of competitors participating at the Games per sport.

Medalists

Alpine skiing 

Han Sang-min
Hwang Min-gyu
Lee Chi-won
Yang Jae-rim

Biathlon 

Choi Bo-gue
Kwon Sang-hyeon
Lee Jeong-min
Sin Eui-hyun
Lee Do-yeon
Seo Vo-ra-mi

Cross-country skiing 

Choi Bo-gue
Kwon Sang-hyeon
Lee Jeong-min
Sin Eui-hyun
Lee Do-yeon
Seo Vo-ra-mi

Para ice hockey

Summary

Preliminary round

Semifinal

Bronze medal game

Snowboarding 

Choi Suk-min
Kim Yun-ho
Park Hang-seung
Park Su-hyeok

Wheelchair curling 

Summary

Round-robin
South Korea has a bye in draws 3, 5, 7, 10, 12 and 17.

Draw 1
Saturday, 10 March, 14:35

Draw 2
Saturday, 10 March, 19:35

Draw 4
Sunday, 11 March, 14:35

Draw 6
Monday, 12 March, 09:35

Draw 8
Monday, 12 March, 19:35

Draw 9
Tuesday, 13 March, 09:35

Draw 11
Tuesday, 13 March, 19:35

Draw 13
Wednesday, 14 March, 14:35

Draw 14
Wednesday, 14 March, 19:35

Draw 15
Thursday, 15 March, 9:35

Draw 16
Thursday, 15 March, 14:35

Semifinal
Friday, 16 March, 15:35

Bronze medal game
Saturday, 17 March, 9:35

Notes

See also 
 South Korea at the 2018 Winter Olympics

References

External links
PyeongChang Official website 
International Paralympic Committee PyeongChang website

Nations at the 2018 Winter Paralympics
2018
Paralympics